Jeffery Hale (April 19, 1803 – November 13, 1864) was a philanthropist in Lower Canada.

Biography
The son of Elizabeth Frances Amherst and John Hale, he was born in Quebec City and was educated in England. Hale served in the Royal Navy from the age of 14 until he was 24, when he returned to Lower Canada to assist his father, who was suffering from poor health, as receiver general for the province. Although Hale temporarily replaced his father, he did not secure the post of receiver general after his father died. He became involved in various charitable organizations and Anglican religious societies. In 1833, he established the first English Sunday school at Quebec City. Hale was a director of the British and Canadian School Society of the District of Quebec and he also provided funds for the establishment and maintenance of other schools. He was a founder of the Quebec Provident and Savings Bank, and also aided in the founding of Mount Hermon Cemetery in Sillery.

Hale died in England at Tunbridge Wells in Kent at the age of 61 and he is buried in Woodbury Park Cemetery. In his will, he provided funds for the establishment of a hospital, the Jeffrey Hale - St Brigid's Hospital.

References 

1803 births
1864 deaths
People from Quebec City
19th-century Canadian philanthropists
Anglophone Quebec people
Canadian people of English descent